Dorothy Evelyn Thompson (29 May 1888 – 2 December 1961) was an English mountaineer known for her climbs in the Alps.

Thompson was born in Kensington to Frederick Charles Thompson and Eleanor Frances (née Wilson). Her parents were frequent hill walkers and she began climbing in Perthshire as a child on family holidays. She joined the Fell and Rock Climbing Club in 1919, while working as a secretary for the School of Oriental Studies in Bloomsbury. She began climbing with the Fell and Rock Climbing Club in Corsica and the Pyrenees before her first trip to the Alps in 1920, when she met Joseph Georges, who would become her climbing partner for many years. In 1929 she became the first woman to ascend Mont Blanc via the Brouillard Ridge. In 1934 she climbed Mont Blanc via the Aiguille de Bionassay, and became the first person to descend the mountain via the Peuteret Ridge.

Thompson completed a book of her climbing memoirs after the Second World War, but only published it privately. She died in Heathfield, East Sussex, in 1961. After her death, her friends and the Ladies' Alpine Club published her memoirs, titled Climbing with Joseph Georges, in 1962.

References

1888 births
1961 deaths
English mountain climbers
Female climbers